Imre Sinkovits  (21 September 1928 in Budapest – 18 January 2001 in Budapest) was a Hungarian actor.

Career
After a year in Downtown Theatre and another in Youth Theatre, in 1949 he got a job in National Theatre, where he stayed until 1956. His breakthrough role was Imre Madách's Moses, which he had played for 22 years, more than 700 times.
On 23 October 1956 he recited Sándor Petőfi's Nemzeti dal at the Petőfi Square in Budapest in front of a crowd of 20,000 people. This was the opening act of a youth protest, which protest in a few hours became a nationwide revolt against the government. Sinkovits became a member of the Hungarian Theatre and Film Association Revolutionary Committee on 30 October.
After the revolution was crushed, Sinkovits was banned from acting for a half year for his activities, and his membership in the National Theatre was terminated. Between 1958 and 1963, he worked in the Attila József Theatre. In 1963 he returned to the National Theatre and he became one of its dominant actors for decades. He played the leading role in a number of films and television series, and was also involved in dubbing and narration. At 4 May 1991 reburial ceremony of Jozsef Cardinal Mindszenty in Esztergom, Sinkovits delivered a powerful rendition of Hungarian poet Mihály Vörösmarty's poem Szózat before the 50,000 mourners in attendance.  Szózat is considered to be a second national anthem of Hungary. In 2022, on the anniversary of his birthday, a star was named after him.

Personal life
In 1951, Sinkovits married Hungarian actress Katalin Gombos (b. 12 February 1929 Hódmezővásárhely; died 6 November 2012 Budapest).  They had two children: Andrew Sinkovits-Vitay and Mariann Sinkovits, both of whom also became actors.  Sinkovits and Gombos are buried in the Óbuda cemetery.

Selected filmography
 1961: Alba Regia 
 1963: Tales of a Long Journey 
 1965: The Corporal and the Others
 1968: Stars of Eger
 1969: The Toth Family 
 1970: Franz Liszt. Dreams of love   - as Franz Liszt

Awards
Kossuth Prize (1966)
Mari Jászai Award (1955, 1962) 
Kazinczy Award (1983)
Order of Merit of the Republic of Hungary, Commander's cross with star, civilian (:hu:A Magyar Köztársasági Érdemrend középkeresztje a csillaggal, 1998)
Hungarian Heritage Award (:hu:Magyar Örökség díj, 1996)
National Actor title (:hu:A Nemzet Színésze, 2000)

References

External links

1928 births
2001 deaths
Hungarian male stage actors
Hungarian male film actors
Hungarian male voice actors
Commander's Crosses with Star of the Order of Merit of the Republic of Hungary (civil)
Artists of Merit of the Hungarian People's Republic